Parashkhol is a village near Nuapada in Nuapada district of Odisha state of India.

References

Villages in Nuapada district